Bludov is a spa municipality and village in Šumperk District in the Olomouc Region of the Czech Republic. It has about 3,100 inhabitants.

Etymology
The name is derived from the name of its probable founder, Blud of Bludov.

Geography
The southwestern part of the municipal territory lies in the Mohelnice Depression lowlands, the northeastern part lies in the Hanušovice Highlands. The Morava River partly forms the western border of the municipality, the Desná partly forms the eastern border.

History
Bludov was probably established at the turn of the 12th and 13th century. Since its foundation, it was purely Czech village. Until the 19th century, it was an agricultural village. Blud of Bludov's son built a castle on the slope of the Háj Hill. The Bludov Castle was destroyed during the Bohemian–Hungarian War (1468–1478). 

In the 15th century Bludov was owned by the lords of Kunštát, by the Waldstein family, and then by the Tunkl of Brníčko family, who built six large ponds near the village. The ponds were dried in the 19th century, because their maintenance did not pay off economically. In 1496, Bludov was acquired by the Zierotins, who had built the Bludov Chateau.

During the second half of the 19th century, Bludov was industrialized. In 1929, the Bludov Spa was opened.

Demographics

Economy

In the lowlands, corn, barley, wheat, oilseed rape, poppy, sugar beet, alfalfa and flax are grown and cattle and broilers raised.

Bludov Spa is focused on treatment of obesity and musculoskeletal disorders, using thermal mineral water containing sulphates, chlorides and sodium.

A quarry called Nový Lom is located on the northern outskirts of the village. There is occasional mining of a metamorphic rock known as bludovit, which contains rare minerals and is used decoratively.

There is a small hydroelectric plant at Habermann's Mill.

Twin towns – sister cities

Bludov is twinned with:
 Lehota pod Vtáčnikom, Slovakia

References

External links

 

 
Villages in Šumperk District
Spa towns in the Czech Republic